HD 177808 is a 6th magnitude star in the constellation Lyra, approximately 610 light years away from Earth. It is a solitary red giant star of the spectral type M0III, meaning it possesses a surface temperature of around 3,940 kelvins. It is therefore much larger and brighter than the Sun, yet cooler in comparison.

References

Lyra (constellation)
177808
M-type giants
7237
093718
Durchmusterung objects